Publius Cornelius Cethegus was a Roman senator and military commander.

Cethegus was elected curule aedile in 187 BC, praetor in 185 BC and consul in 181 BC. During his consulship, the grave of the legendary Roman king Numa Pompilius was discovered. He and his colleague Marcus Baebius Tamphilus were awarded a triumph over the Ligurians although no battle had been actually fought. In 173 BC Cethegus was appointed as one of ten commissioners to divide the Ligurian and Gallic lands in Italy.

References

2nd-century BC Roman consuls
2nd-century BC Roman praetors
Curule aediles
Publius
Roman patricians